The Boston mayoral election of 1910 occurred on Tuesday, January 11, 1910. John F. Fitzgerald, who had been Mayor of Boston from 1906 to 1908, defeated incumbent George A. Hibbard and two other candidates.

This was the first Boston mayoral election held under a new city charter, which made the election nonpartisan, and increased the mayor's term from two years to four years. Due to November voting on the charter change, this election was held in January, with the term of the incumbent mayor extended into February.

Fitzgerald was inaugurated on Monday, February 7.

Candidates
 John F. Fitzgerald, former Mayor of Boston (1906–1908), and former member of the United States House of Representatives (1895–1901) and the Massachusetts Senate (1892–1894)
 George A. Hibbard, Mayor of Boston since 1908
 James J. Storrow, banker
 Nathaniel H. Taylor, newspaper editorial writer, brother of The Boston Globe publisher Charles H. Taylor

Results

See also
List of mayors of Boston, Massachusetts

References

Further reading

External links
 Boston Mayor Race - Jan 11, 1910 at ourcampaigns.com

Boston mayoral
Boston
1910
Non-partisan elections
1910s in Boston